Clyde Shire was a local government area in the South Coast region of New South Wales, Australia.

Clyde Shire was proclaimed on 7 March 1906, one of 134 shires created after the passing of the Local Government (Shires) Act 1905. 

The shire offices were in Tomerong. Other urban areas in the shire included Huskisson and Sussex Inlet.

The shire was amalgamated with the Municipality of Berry, Municipality of South Shoalhaven, Municipality of Broughton Vale, Municipality of Ulladulla, Municipality of Nowra and Camberwarra Shire to form Shoalhaven Shire on 1 July 1948.

References

Former local government areas of New South Wales
1906 establishments in Australia
1948 disestablishments in Australia